The 1967 Miami Hurricanes football team represented the University of Miami as an independent during the 1967 NCAA University Division football season. Led by fourth-year head coach Charlie Tate, the Hurricanes played their home games at the Miami Orange Bowl in Miami, Florida. They finished the season 7–4 and were invited to the Bluebonnet Bowl, where they lost to Colorado.

Schedule

Roster
 Ted Hendricks, Jr.
 Vince Opalsky, So.

References

Miami
Miami Hurricanes football seasons
Miami Hurricanes football